Shawkat Zaman (born 1 January 2000) is an Afghan cricketer. He made his List A debut for Band-e-Amir Region in the 2017 Ghazi Amanullah Khan Regional One Day Tournament on 10 August 2017. He made his Twenty20 debut for Kabul Eagles in the 2017 Shpageeza Cricket League on 11 September 2017. He made his first-class debut for Speen Ghar Region in the 2017–18 Ahmad Shah Abdali 4-day Tournament on 20 October 2017, scoring 169 runs in the first innings.

In September 2018, he was named in Kabul's squad in the first edition of the Afghanistan Premier League tournament. In November 2019, he was named in Afghanistan's squad for the 2019 ACC Emerging Teams Asia Cup in Bangladesh.

References

External links
 

2000 births
Living people
Afghan cricketers
Band-e-Amir Dragons cricketers
Kabul Eagles cricketers
Kabul Zwanan cricketers
Spin Ghar Tigers cricketers
Place of birth missing (living people)